Punta Eugenia is a headland in the Mulegé Municipality. It marks the Western tip of the Vizcaíno Peninsula, thus being the westernmost point on the mainland of the state of Baja California Sur. It belongs to the larger area of El Vizcaíno Biosphere Reserve; it is separated from the mainland of the  Baja Peninsula by the Vizcaíno Desert. Infrastructural developments, like the completion of the Vizcaíno-Bahía Tortugas Highway recently allowed for better integration of the traditionally secluded area (Punta Eugenia can be accessed from Bahía Tortugas by a dirt road). Touristically, the area of Punta Eugenia is still largely unexploited. The settlement Punta Eugenia, with 19 inhabitants in 2017, is traditionally populated by native and seasonally recruited fishermen and their families. Fishing industry in the Vizcaíno region annually produces thousands of tons of various species, that are mostly exported to Asia and the North American market. 

To the Northwest of Punta Eugenia lie Isla Natividad, Cedros Island and the Islas San Benito. The pattern of ocean currents and eddies around Punta Eugenia has been shown to be a significant phylogeographic break in the distribution of fish species.

Climate 
Punta Eugenia has mild desert climate. On 4 December 1994, Punta Eugenia received  of rain, the wettest day on record.

References 

Headlands of Mexico
Landforms of Baja California Sur
Mulegé Municipality